Elk Valley may refer to:

Elk Valley (British Columbia), valley in Canada
Elk Valley (Missouri), valley in United States
Elk Valley, Tennessee, unincorporated community in United States
Elk Valley Park, Alberta, locality in Rocky View County, Alberta, Canada
Elk Valley Provincial Park, provincial park in Alberta, Canada
Elk Valley Rancheria, settlement in California, United States